Gonbad-e Kabud (also Romanized as Gonbad-e Kabūd and Gonbad Kabūd) is a village in Garin Rural District, Zarrin Dasht District, Nahavand County, Hamadan Province, Iran. At the 2006 census, its population was 1,676, in 421 families.

References 

Populated places in Nahavand County